The 1960 Football Championship of Ukrainian SSR (Class B) was the 30th season of association football competition of the Ukrainian SSR, which was part of the Ukrainian Class B. It was the eleventh in the Soviet Class B. 

The 1960 Football Championship of Ukrainian SSR (Class B) was won by FC Metalurh Zaporizhia.

Format 

In 1960 Class B football competitions were reorganized. Ukrainian teams of the 1959 Soviet Class B were filtered into a separate republican Class B football competitions that were administered by the Ukrainian sports organization (federation). The new competition obtained already existing member-clubs of the Class B that are based in Ukraine and almost the same number of clubs were added from regular republican competitions as part of expansion.

List of grandfathered clubs included 25 teams of masters, FC Sudnobudivnyk Mykolaiv (formerly Avanhard), FC Metalurh Dnipropetrovsk, FC Metalurh Zaporizhia, FC Spartak Kherson, FC Khimik Dniprodzerzhynsk, FC Kolhospnyk Cherkasy, FC Arsenal Kyiv, FC Zirka Kirovohrad, FC Polissya Zhytomyr (formerly Avanhard), FC Avanhard Kryvyi Rih (formerly Kryvyi Rih), FC Kolhospnyk Poltava, FC Lokomotyv Vinnytsia, SKA Odessa (formerly SKVO), FC Chornomorets Odesa, SKA Lviv (formerly SKVO), FC Spartak Uzhhorod, FC Kolhospnyk Rivno, SKCF Sevastopol, FC Avanhard Simferopol, FC Spartak Stanislav, FC Avanhard Ternopil, FC Trudovi Rezervy Luhansk, FC Lokomotyv Stalino, FC Shakhtar Kadiivka, and FC Shakhtar Horlivka. Some teams of masters had own amateur squad with the same names competing at republican competitions among which were SKA Odessa, Avanhard Mykolaiv and others.

They were joined by 11 more teams that obtained the teams of masters status, among which were newly created clubs FC Desna Chernihiv, FC Dynamo Khmelnytskyi, and FC Volyn Lutsk as well as already existing clubs FC Avanhard Chernivtsi, FC Avanhard Zhdanov, FC Naftovyk Drohobych, FC Avanhard Zhovti Vody, FC Khimik Severodonetsk, FC Avanhard Sumy, FC Avanhard Kramatorsk, and FC Torpedo Kharkiv.

Location map

Zone 1

Relegated teams
 none

Promoted teams
 FC Avanhard Chernihiv – (debut)
 FC Dynamo Khmelnytskyi – (debut)
 FC Volyn Lutsk – (debut)
 FC Avanhard Chernivtsi – (debut)
 FC Naftovyk Drohobych – (debut)

Relocated and renamed teams
 FC Sudnobudivnyk Mykolaiv was last year known as FC Avanhard Mykolaiv
 FC Polissya Zhytomyr was last year known as FC Avanhard Zhytomyr
 SKA Lviv was last year known as SKVO Lviv

League's standing

Zone 2

Relegated teams
 none

Promoted teams
 FC Avanhard Zhovti Vody – (debut)
 FC Khimik Severodonetsk – (debut)
 FC Avanhard Sumy – (debut)
 FC Avanhard Kramatorsk – (debut)
 FC Torpedo Kharkiv – (debut)
 FC Avanhard Zhdanov – (debut)

Relocated and renamed teams
 FC Avanhard Kryvyi Rih was last year known as Kryvyi Rih team
 SKA Odessa was last year known as SKVO Odessa

League's standing

Play-offs

Championship
 FC Sudnobudivnyk Mykolaiv - FC Metalurh Zaporizhia 2:6 0:0

Promotion
 FC Shakhtar Donetsk - FC Metalurh Zaporizhia 2:0 0:1

Relegation

 FC Volyn Lutsk - FC Shakhtar Novovolynsk 3:0 0:1
 FC Avanhard Kryvyi Rih - FC Metalurh Nikopol 3:0 5:3
 FC Polissya Zhytomyr - FC Shakhtar Korostyshev 1:3 5:0
 FC Spartak Uzhhorod - FC Avanhard Khust 4:1 1:1
 FC Zirka Kirovohrad - FC Shakhtar Oleksandriya 2:1 1:1
 FC Avanhard Simferopol - FC Metalurh Kerch 2:0 3:0
 FC Chornomorets Odesa - FC Dunayets Izmail 1:0 5:1
 FC Kolhospnyk Poltava - FC Lokomotyv Poltava 5:3 1:3 2:1
 FC Kolhospnyk Rivno - FC Spartak Rivno 1:0 3:1
 FC Shakhtar Horlivka - FC Shvernik Mine Stalino 4:1 1:0
 FC Avanhard Sumy - FC Avanhard Konotop 7:0 3:0
 FC Avanhard Ternopil - FC Motor Ternopil 1:1 5:1
 FC Torpedo Kharkiv - FC Start Chuhuyiv 2:0 2:2
 FC Spartak Kherson - FC Enerhiya Nova Kakhovka 1:0 1:0
 FC Dynamo Khmelnytskyi - FC Avanhard Kamianets-Podilskyi 3:0 2:4
 FC Kolhospnyk Cherkasy - FC Spartak Uman 3:0 1:0
 FC Avanhard Chernivtsi - FC Spartak Chernivtsi 3:0 5:0
 FC Avanhard Chernihiv - FC Avanhard Pryluky 2:1 1:1
 FC Arsenal Kyiv - FC Oktyabrskyi Raion Kyiv 0:0 2:0
 FC Spartak Stanislav - FC Khimik Kalush 1:0 2:1
 FC Shakhtar Kadiivka - FC October Revolution Factory Luhansk 6:1 3:1
 FC Naftovyk Drohobych - FC Avanhard Vynnyky 2:0 3:0

Notes:
 Games between FC Metalurh Zaporizhia, FC Sudnobudivnyk Mykolaiv and FC Lokomotyv Vinnytsia with champions of their respective oblasts were not conducted as the aforementioned teams finished in top three teams in each of the Class B zones.
 The champion of Kiev Oblast did not participate in relegation play-offs as the oblast did not have its own representative in the Class B competitions.

See also
 Soviet First League

Notes

External links
 1960 season regulations.  Luhansk football portal
 1960 Soviet championships (all leagues) at helmsoccer.narod.ru

1960
2
Soviet
Soviet
football
Football Championship of the Ukrainian SSR